Siderolamprus laf is a species of lizard of the Diploglossidae family. It is found in Panama.

It was formerly classified in the genus Celestus, but was moved to Siderolamprus in 2021.

References

Siderolamprus
Reptiles described in 2016
Reptiles of Panama
Endemic fauna of Panama